Krishna Das is a Bharatiya Janata Party politician from Assam. He is the former chairman of the Karimganj Municipal Board, and has been fielded as the candidate from the Karimganj constituency (reserved for Scheduled Castes) by his party in the 2014 Indian general election.

He is currently a member of the State Executive Board of BJP in Assam. Additionally, he is the chairperson of the SC Board of Karimganj district.

References

Assam politicians
National Democratic Alliance candidates in the 2014 Indian general election
Living people
Year of birth missing (living people)
Bharatiya Janata Party politicians from Assam